Gascoigne Wood Junction railway station was a railway station near Sherburn-in-Elmet in North Yorkshire, England. It was originally opened as a junction station, enabling transfers for passengers between trains. It was later a private halt station for the staff who worked at the Gascoigne Wood marshalling yard. It opened in 1839, and was closed, renamed and re-opened several times before closing completely in 1959.

History
The station, called York Junction, was originally opened in 1839 at a point near to where the Leeds and Selby Railway (L&S) crossed over the York & North Midland Railway (Y&NMR). A north to east curve was built linking the two railways with a station at the east end of the junction. This was closed in 1840 when the L&S became part of the Y&NMR, and traffic for Leeds was diverted to run via  and Methley into Leeds Hunslet Lane. Whilst Hunslet Lane was nearer to the centre of Leeds than the Marsh Lane terminus of the L&S, the route to Hunslet Lane from Gascoigne Wood Junction was  longer. In December 1850, the station was re-opened as Old Milford Junction (or Old Junction), to allow services to work from the station to Leeds, which was three times per day. The locomotive had no access to a turntable, and rather than turn it on the triangle, it simply worked tender backwards towards Leeds. As the line westwards towards Micklefield from Old Junction was on an uphill gradient of 1-in-130, often trains would be split, then reformed between Micklefield and  stations (which was on a level section).

In April 1867, it was renamed from Old Junction to Milford Old Junction, and on 1 November 1879, the station was renamed again, this time to Gascoigne Wood Junction. The station was located at the western end of the marshalling yard built at Gascoigne Wood for the transfer of coal trains. Land had been bought up surrounding the station, and the yard was built around 1907, when the station was re-opened as a private staff halt, though permission was granted for the families of railway persons working at Gascoigne Wood to use the station. A map from the 1890s shows the station having two platforms with access to all three lines west, south and north, however, the map of 1950 shows a single platform accessible only from the Leeds line.

One signal box was adjacent to the west end of the station, whilst at the eastern end, another signal box was located at Hagg Lane crossing. In 1897, the NER determined that the station goods yard and the mineral yard (a term for the marshalling yard), each needed a shunter driver. Trip workings of coal from collieries local to the yard were worked from Gascoigne Wood, with engines sourced from Selby.

Whilst the Gascoigne Wood yard was closed in 1959 at the same time as the staff halt station, it was later used to build the pit head for the Selby Coalfield on the site of the former coal sidings.

Chronology

Services
The principal reason behind the station was to enable passengers to transfer between trains on the different lines. Apart from the goods yard, no freight was handled at the station, being listed in the Clearing House Handbook for 1894 as having no freight facilities. Also at this time, the local services on the line from Leeds Marsh Lane terminus arrived at Old Junction and then worked to Milford Junction to terminate. In June 1877, services amounted to six through workings per day between Hull and Leeds. At this point, in the Bradshaw's Timetable, the station is referred to as Old Junction, with Milford Junction being on the old Y&NMR line which ran on a north–south axis. In the 1880s, a connecting service between Old Junction/Gascoigne Wood Junction and Milford Junction (to the south), operated to allow the transfer of passengers between trains.

In 1885, services were listed as being six through the week, and two services on a Sunday, all running between Leeds and Hull.

Incidents
23 December 1850, a train from York had arrived at Old Junction consisting of 22 carriages, and was split to go to Leeds up the 1-in-130 gradient. The first portion was left on a level section between Micklefield and Garforth, with the locomotive returning for the remainder of the train without the guards van. As the locomotive was ascending the bank with the last six vehicles, a cable snapped and they ran away downhill. As there was no guards van, the wagons could not be braked on the downgrade and smashed into a train at Old Junction being formed to go to Leeds. A jury at the inquest found the guard, Edward Grimston, culpable of the accident, and the coroner returned him to Yorkshire Assizes for a charge of manslaughter. At the trial, Grimston was cleared of all manslaughter charges, but was accused of great negligence on not taking the guards van with him as per company policy. There was some debate about whether or not the van would have stopped the wagons as they accelerated over the  downgrade.
The passenger train had just left Milford Junction station and was approaching Gascoigne Wood Junction station. Nine of the passengers were injured, two seriously, and the guard jumped from his van when the two trains collided.

Notes

References

Sources

External links

GWJ on Railscot

Rail junctions in England
Railway stations in Great Britain opened in 1839
Former North Eastern Railway (UK) stations
Former York and North Midland Railway stations
Railway stations in Great Britain closed in 1840
Railway stations in Great Britain opened in 1850
Railway stations in Great Britain opened in 1907